The Waikare River is a river in the Northland Region of New Zealand's North Island. Rising in the Russell Forest, it flows into the southern end of the Waikare Inlet, a drowned valley which forms a southeastern arm of the Bay of Islands.

See also
List of rivers of New Zealand

References

Far North District
Rivers of the Northland Region
Bay of Islands
Rivers of New Zealand